The 2001 Peterborough City Council election took place on 7 June 2001 to elect members of Peterborough City Council in England. This was on the same day as other local elections.

Election result

References

2001
2000s in Cambridgeshire
Peterborough